CJIK-FM is a First Nations community radio station that operates at 94.1 FM in Sheshatshiu, Newfoundland and Labrador, Canada.

The station is owned by the Sheshatshiu Radio Society.

External links

Jik